Kundrathur taluk is a taluk of Kanchipuram district of the Indian state of Tamil Nadu. The headquarters of the taluk is the town of Kundrathur. It is formed by bifurcating Sriperumbudur taluk.

References

Taluks of Kanchipuram district